Josef Augusta  (24 November 1946 in Havlíčkův Brod – 16 February 2017 in Jihlava) was a Czechoslovak ice hockey player and coach, and a silver medalist from the 1976 Winter Olympics. He is the father of former hockey player Patrik Augusta.

He was head coach of the Czech national hockey team at the 2002 Winter Olympics and the World Championships in 2000, 2001 and 2002. The Czech team won gold medals in 2000 and 2001. He died from pancreatic cancer on 16 February 2017 at the age of 70.

References

External links 
 
 
 
 
 

1946 births
2017 deaths
Czech ice hockey coaches
Czech Republic men's national ice hockey team coaches
Deaths from pancreatic cancer
HC Dukla Jihlava players
Ice hockey players at the 1976 Winter Olympics
Olympic ice hockey players of Czechoslovakia
Olympic medalists in ice hockey
Olympic silver medalists for Czechoslovakia
Sportspeople from Havlíčkův Brod
Czech expatriate sportspeople in Italy
Czech expatriate sportspeople in Slovakia
Czech expatriate ice hockey people
Czech ice hockey forwards
Czechoslovak ice hockey forwards
Czechoslovak ice hockey coaches